Huch'uy Anqas (Quechua huch'uy little, anqas blue, Hispanicized spelling Uchiangas, Uchuiangas) is a  mountain in the Chunta mountain range in the Andes of Peru.

Location
It is situated in the Huancavelica Region, Huancavelica Province, Acobambilla District. Huch'uy Anqas lies south of Anqasqucha and east of the lake named Anqasqucha (Quechua for "blue lake") and north of Chiliqucha.

References

Mountains of Huancavelica Region
Mountains of Peru